The Research Institutes for Experimental Medicine are a research facility in Berlin, Germany. This building is commonly known as Mouse Bunker, or Mäusebunker in German. Until 2003, its official name was Central Animal Laboratories of the Free University of Berlin.

Planning and Construction  
This facility was built for the purpose of live animal testing. Animals for experimentation were bred in the facility too, to provide sterile conditions and a maximum amount of control. It is located inclose proximity to the Benjamin Franklin Medical Center and the Institute for Hygiene and Microbiology. These three facilities were erected to provide a high performing infrastructure for the development and application of new medicine and vaccines. 

The Mouse Bunker's original designers are husband and wife Gerd Hänska and Magdalena Hänska. They started the design between 1965 and 1967. Construction began in 1971. By that time, Gerd and Magdalena Hänska were working separately and only Gerd Hänska continued planning the Mouse Bunker. Detailed planning and construction was done by Gerd Hänska and Kurt Schmersow between 1971 and 1981.

Reception 
The building has been viewed as controversial from its very beginning. The sinister design and the use for animal testing were not popular with the general public. Over the years it has become more and more popular among friends of brutalist architecture. Numerous international publications have featured Mouse Bunker as a prominent example of brutalist architecture in Germany.

Striking features are the building's pyramid-like shape and prominent blue ventilation pipes. The outer shell is made of pre-fabricated concrete panels. Triangular bay windows are placed on the long facades. The nickname Mouse Bunker emerged in reference to the buildings overall defensiveness, featuring slanted outer walls and a solid concrete shell.

After the current owner Charité announced plans for demolition, public awareness has increased even more. A petition to save the building was initiated by architect Gunnar Klack and art historian Felix Torkar in 2020. The discussion about the future of the Mouse Bunker was featured in international publications. The Mouse Bunker has been referenced in connection to other international examples of brutalist buildings and their respective future perspectives – for example the Tel Aviv central bus station in Israel or the Vilnius Palace of Concerts and Sports in Lithuania.

Filmmaker Nathan Eddy shot the documentary Battleship Berlin, which deals with the Research Institutes for Experimental Medicine and the neighboring Institute for Hygiene and Microbiology.

External links

References 

Buildings and structures in Berlin
Brutalist architecture
Buildings and structures completed in 1981
Animal testing
Free University of Berlin